Blaine M. Perkins (born February 28, 2000) is an American professional stock car racing driver. He competes full-time in the NASCAR Xfinity Series, driving the No. 07 Chevrolet Camaro for SS-Green Light Racing. He has also previously competed in the NASCAR Craftsman Truck Series, ARCA Menards Series and the ARCA Menards Series West.

Racing career

Perkins started his racing career in Bandolero racing.

Perkins made his debut in the West Series in 2015 at All American Speedway in Roseville, California, driving the No. 54 Toyota for Bill McAnally Racing, where he started 17th and finished 13th. After that, he secured a full-time ride in the series the following season with Steve Portenga Racing in their No. 21 car.

Perkins moved to the ARCA Racing Series for 2018 and drove in five races for Mason Mitchell Motorsports in the team's No. 98 and No. 78 Chevrolet's. He had previously made his debut in the series the prior year at Kentucky for Mitchell's team, where he started and finished ninth in that race.

In 2019, Perkins focused on local racing, winning track championships at Irwindale Speedway and Kern County Raceway Park as well as winning the California title in the Whelen All-American Series.

Perkins returned to the West Series in 2020, joining Sunrise Ford Racing to drive their No. 9 Ford, replacing Jagger Jones as a driver on the team. Perkins' new teammate Trevor Huddleston drove the No. 9 in 2019 and moved to the No. 6, replacing Jones. Perkins earned his first win in the West Series in the second race of the Utah Motorsports Campus doubleheader on June 27. He also won the pole for the first race of the doubleheader, which was his first pole in the West Series. He finished eleventh in that race.

Perkins moved up to the NASCAR Xfinity Series in 2021, driving part-time for Our Motorsports in their new second car, the No. 03, for at least six races beginning at Martinsville in April. After the No. 03 failed to qualify for the first few races of the season due to it not having enough owner points with entry lists of over 40 cars, Our Motorsports acquired the No. 23 car jointly fielded by RSS Racing and Reaume Brothers Racing before the race at Las Vegas in March, and Perkins is now expected to instead run his races in that car. Perkins got his first career stage win in the Xfinity Series at Talladega, winning stage 2. He finished 13th in the end. On December 23, 2021, it was announced that Perkins would drive the No. 9 Chevrolet Silverado full-time for CR7 Motorsports in 2022.

On January 9, 2023, it was announced that Perkins would run full-time in the Xfinity Series in 2023, driving the No. 07 car for SS-Green Light Racing.

Motorsports career results

Stock car career summary 

† As Perkins was a guest driver, he was ineligible for championship points.

NASCAR
(key) (Bold – Pole position awarded by qualifying time. Italics – Pole position earned by points standings or practice time. * – Most laps led.)

Xfinity Series

Camping World Truck Series

ARCA Menards Series
(key) (Bold – Pole position awarded by qualifying time. Italics – Pole position earned by points standings or practice time. * – Most laps led. ** – All laps led.)

ARCA Menards Series West

 Season still in progress
 Ineligible for series points

References

External links
 
 

Living people
2000 births
Racing drivers from Bakersfield, California
NASCAR drivers
ARCA Menards Series drivers